Bledius philadelphicus is a species of spiny-legged rove beetle in the family Staphylinidae. It is found in North America.

References

Further reading

 

Oxytelinae
Articles created by Qbugbot
Beetles described in 1919